George Eric Deacon Alcock, MBE (28 August 1912, in Peterborough, Northamptonshire – 15 December 2000) was an English astronomer. He was one of the most successful visual discoverers of novae and comets.

George’s interest in astronomy was sparked by seeing the solar eclipse of 8 April 1921. His interest evolved into the observation of meteors and meteor showers, and on 27 March 1935 he joined the British Astronomical Association. In 1953 he decided to start searching for comets and in 1955 began searching for novae. His technique was to memorize the patterns of thousands of stars, so that he would visually recognize any intruder.

In 1959 he discovered comet C/1959 Q1 (Alcock), the first comet discovered in Britain since 1894, and only five days later discovered another, C/1959 Q2 (Alcock). He discovered two more comets in 1963 (C/1963 F1 Alcock) and 1965. He later discovered his first nova, Nova Delphini 1967 (HR Delphini), which turned out to have an unusual light-curve. He discovered two more novae, LV Vul (in 1968) and V368 Sct (in 1970). He found his fifth and final comet in 1983: C/1983 H1 (IRAS-Araki-Alcock). In 1991 he found the nova V838 Her.

Honours and awards

Alcock became a Fellow of 3 British societies in 1947: the Royal Astronomical Society, the Royal Geographical Society, and the Royal Meteorological Society. He won the Jackson-Gwilt Medal of the Royal Astronomical Society in 1963. On 7 February 1979, Queen Elizabeth II conferred on him an MBE. In 1981 he received the International Amateur Achievement Award from the Astronomical Society of the Pacific.

An asteroid, 3174 Alcock is named after him.

He also maintained an active interest in meteorology (the study of weather, unrelated to his interest in meteors).

His achievements were fairly remarkable, and with the modern invention of CCDs and photometry and automated and computerized search programs that make his visual discovery techniques seem entirely quaint and obsolete, it is unlikely that such achievements will ever be repeated.

In 1996, Genesis Publications published a limited edition signed biography, authored by Kay Williams, entitled "Under An English Heaven - The Life of George Alcock".

After his death, a plaque was placed in Peterborough Cathedral in his memory.

Personal life
In 1936 Alcock met Mary Green through their shared interest in astronomy. They were married 7 June 1941, and moved to the village of Farcet from 1955, in a house they called Antares, where Alcock discovered five comets and five nova. Mary died on 25 October 1991.

References

External links
 Martin Mobberley. George Alcock (1912-2000) remembered
 Ian Ridpath.  The man with the astronomical memory. New Scientist 1982 December 16

1912 births
2000 deaths
20th-century British astronomers
Discoverers of comets
Members of the Order of the British Empire
People from Peterborough